Doddabathi  is a village in the southern state of Karnataka, India. It is located in the Davanagere taluk of Davanagere district.It Had A hill called bathi gudda.In this village sri revanasiddeshwara temple is famous in Doddabathi, Davanagere, Karnataka</ref> It is located in the Davanagere taluk of Davanagere district.

Demographics
 India census, Doddabathi had a population of 6442 with 3291 males and 3151 females.

See also
 Davanagere
 Districts of Karnataka

References

External links
 http://Davanagere.nic.in/

Villages in Davanagere district